The 2021–22 season of Petro de Luanda men's basketball team was the 42nd in the existence of the club and the 2nd in the Basketball Africa League (BAL).  

Petro won the national treble, winning the Angolan League, Cup and Super Cup competitions. In the BAL, it lost to US Monastir in the 2022 BAL Finals in its first finals appearance.

Transactions

Additions

|}

Subtractions

|}

Roster

Angolan Basketball League

Regular season

 Source: FAB

Playoffs

|-
!colspan=12 style=""|Quarterfinals

|-
!colspan=12 style=""|Semifinals
|-

|-
!colspan=12 style=""|Finals
|-

|}

Individual awards
Angolan Basketball League MVP
Gerson Gonçalves
All-BAL First Team
Carlos Morais
BAL All-Defensive Team
Childe Dundão
BAL Coach of the Year
José Neto
Angolan League Coach of the Year
José Neto

References

Petro de Luanda